Daniel Chong (born November 19, 1978) is an American animator, storyboard artist, writer, director, and producer. He is best known as the creator of Cartoon Network's We Bare Bears (2015–2019). He also directed, wrote and executive produced We Bare Bears: The Movie (2020).

Chong worked as a storyboard artist on the animated films Bolt (2008), Cars 2 (2011), The Lorax (2012), Free Birds (2013), and Inside Out (2015).

Early life
Chong was born in Fargo, North Dakota to Singaporean Chinese immigrants. He grew up in Fountain Valley, California, and attended California Institute of the Arts. He currently resides in Los Angeles, California.

Career
Chong began his career as a storyboard artist for numerous animation giants, such as Blue Sky Studios, Walt Disney Animation Studios, Illumination Entertainment, and Pixar Animation Studios. He worked as a storyboard artist on the animated films Bolt (2008), Cars 2 (2011), The Lorax (2012), Free Birds (2013), Despicable Me 2 (2013), and Inside Out (2015).

While working at Pixar, Chong worked on the television specials Toy Story of Terror! (2013) and Toy Story That Time Forgot (2014), the former of which won him an Annie Award.

Chong went on to create the animated series We Bare Bears, which premiered in 2014. The initial idea for We Bare Bears came from a webcomic that he had created in 2010 called The Three Bare Bears. The webcomic ended almost a year later, but he carried the idea with him. Chong has cited Seinfeld, Broad City, Peanuts, Aardman Animations and Wes Anderson as inspirations for the style and tone of the show. Chong directed, wrote, and executive produced a film adaptation of the series, We Bare Bears: The Movie, which was released in June 2020, thus ending the series.

In December 2020, Chong revealed on Twitter he had returned to Pixar and was working on a project there.

Filmography

Film

Television

Awards and nominations

References

External links 

American animated film producers
1978 births
American people of Chinese descent
Animators from New York (state)
American storyboard artists
Living people
California Institute of the Arts alumni
Animators from California
Artists from Berkeley, California
Cartoon Network Studios people
Pixar people
People from Queens, New York
Artists from New York City
Walt Disney Animation Studios people
Illumination (company) people
We Bare Bears